A church bell in Christian architecture is a bell which is rung in a church for a variety of religious purposes, and can be heard outside the building. Traditionally they are used to call worshippers to the church for a communal service, and to announce the fixed times of daily Christian prayer, called the canonical hours, which number seven and are contained in breviaries. They are also rung on special occasions such as a wedding, or a funeral service. In some religious traditions they are used within the liturgy of the church service to signify to people that a particular part of the service has been reached. The ringing of church bells, in the Christian tradition, is also believed to drive out demons.

The traditional European church bell (see cutaway drawing) used in Christian churches worldwide consists of a cup-shaped metal resonator with a pivoted clapper hanging inside which strikes the sides when the bell is swung. It is hung within a steeple or belltower of a church or religious building, so the sound can reach a wide area. Such bells are either fixed in position ("hung dead") or hung from a pivoted beam (the "headstock") so they can swing to and fro. A rope hangs from a lever or wheel attached to the headstock, and when the bell ringer pulls on the rope the bell swings back and forth and the clapper hits the inside, sounding the bell. Bells that are hung dead are normally sounded by hitting the sound bow with a hammer or occasionally by a rope which pulls the internal clapper against the bell.

A church may have a single bell, or a collection of bells which are tuned to a common scale. They may be stationary and chimed, rung randomly by swinging through a small arc, or swung through a full circle to enable the high degree of control of English change ringing.

Before modern communications, church bells were a common way to call the community together for all purposes, both sacred and secular.

Uses and traditions

Call to prayer
Oriental Orthodox Christians, such as Copts and Indians, use a breviary such as the Agpeya and Shehimo to pray the canonical hours seven times a day while facing in the eastward direction; church bells are tolled, especially in monasteries, to mark these seven fixed prayer times.

The early Christians thus came to pray the Lord's Prayer at 9 am, 12 pm and 3 pm.

Many Catholic Christian churches ring their bells thrice a day, at 6 am, 12 pm, and 6 pm to call the faithful to recite the Angelus, a prayer recited in honour of the Incarnation of God.

Some Protestant Christian Churches ring church bells during the congregational recitation of the Lord's Prayer, after the sermon, in order to alert those who are unable to be present to "unite themselves in spirit with the congregation".

In many historic Christian Churches, church bells are also rung on All Hallows' Eve, as well as during the processions of Candlemas and Palm Sunday; the only time of the Christian Year when church bells are not rung include Maundy Thursday through the Easter Vigil. The Christian tradition of the ringing of church bells from a belltower is analogous to the Islamic tradition of the adhan from a minaret.

Call to worship
Most Christian denominations ring church bells to call the faithful to worship, signalling the start of a mass or service of worship. 

In the United Kingdom predominantly in the Anglican church, there is a strong tradition of change ringing on full-circle tower bells for about half an hour before a service. This originated from the early 17th century when bell ringers found that swinging a bell through a large arc gave more control over the time between successive strikes of the clapper. This culminated in ringing bells through a full circle, which let ringers easily produce different striking sequences; known as changes.

Exorcism of demons
In Christianity, the ringing of church bells is traditionally believed to drive out demons and other unclean spirits. Inscriptions on church bells relating to this purpose of church bells, as well as the purpose of serving as a call to prayer and worship, were customary, for example "the sound of this bell vanquishes tempests, repels demons, and summons men". Some churches have several bells with the justification that "the more bells a church had, the more loudly they rang, and the greater the distance over which they could be heard, the less likely it was that evil forces would trouble the parish."

Funeral and memorial ringing
The ringing of a church bell in the English tradition to announce a death is called a death knell. The pattern of striking depended on the person who had died; for example in the counties of Kent and Surrey in England it was customary to ring three times three strokes for a man and three times two for a woman, with a varying usage for children. The age of the deceased was then rung out. In small settlements this could effectively identify who had just died.

There were three occasions surrounding a death when bells could be rung. There was the "Passing Bell" to warn of impending death, the second the Death Knell to announce the death, and the last was the "Lych Bell", or "Corpse Bell" which was rung at the funeral as the procession approached the church. This latter is known today as the Funeral toll.

A more modern tradition where there are full-circle bells is to use "half-muffles" when sounding one bell as a tolled bell, or all the bells in change-ringing. This means a leather muffle is placed on the clapper of each bell so that there is a loud "open" strike followed by a muffled strike, which has a very sonorous and mournful effect. The tradition in the United Kingdom is that bells are only fully muffled for the death of a sovereign.  A slight variant on this rule occurred in 2015 when the bones of Richard III of England were interred in Leicester Cathedral 532 years after his death.

Sanctus bells

The term "Sanctus bell" traditionally referred to a bell suspended in a bell-cot at the apex of the nave roof, over the chancel arch, or hung in the church tower, in medieval churches. This bell was rung at the singing of the Sanctus and again at the elevation of the consecrated elements, to indicate to those not present in the building that the moment of consecration had been reached. The practice and the term remain in common use in many Anglican churches.

Within the body of a church the function of a sanctus bell can also be performed by a small hand bell or set of such bells (called altar bells) rung shortly before the consecration of the bread and wine into the Body and Blood of Christ and again when the consecrated elements are shown to the people. Sacring rings or "Gloria wheels" are commonly used in Catholic churches in Spain and its former colonies for this purpose.

Orthodox Church

In the Eastern Orthodox Church there is a long and complex history of bell ringing, with particular bells being rung in particular ways to signify different parts of the divine services, Funeral tolls, etc. This custom is particularly sophisticated in the Russian Orthodox Church. Russian bells are usually stationary, and are sounded by pulling on a rope that is attached to the clapper so that it will strike the inside of the bell.

Victory Celebration
The noon church bell tolling in Europe has a specific historical significance that has its roots in the Siege of Belgrade by the Ottomans in 1456. Initially, the bell ringing was intended as a call to prayer for the victory of the defenders of Belgrade. However, because in many European countries the news of victory arrived before the order for prayer, the ringing of the church bells was believed to be in celebration of the victory. As a result, the significance of noon bell ringing is now a commemoration of John Hunyadi's victory against the Turks.

Other uses

Clock chimes
Some churches have a clock chime which uses a turret clock to broadcast the time by striking the hours and sometimes the quarters. A well-known musical striking pattern is the Westminster Quarters. This is only done when the bells are stationary, and the clock mechanism actuates hammers striking on the outside of the sound-bows of the bells. In the cases of bells which are normally swung for other ringing, there is a manual lock-out mechanism which prevents the hammers from operating whilst the bells are being rung.

Warning
In World War II in Great Britain, all church bells were silenced, to ring only to inform of an invasion by enemy troops. However this ban was lifted temporarily in 1942 by order of Winston Churchill. Starting with Easter Sunday, April 25, 1943, the Control of Noise (Defence) (No. 2) Order, 1943, allowed that church bells could be rung to summon worshippers to church on Sundays, Good Friday and Christmas Day. On May 27, 1943, all restrictions were removed.

In the 2021 German floods it was reported that church bells were rung to warn inhabitants of coming floods. In Beyenburg in Wuppertal the last friar of Steinhaus Abbey rang the storm bells after other systems failed. Some church bells are being used in England for similar purposes.

Design and ringing technique

Christian church bells have the form of a cup-shaped cast metal resonator with a flared thickened rim, and a pivoted clapper hanging from its centre inside. It is usually mounted high in a bell tower on top of the church, so it can be heard by the surrounding community. The bell is suspended from a headstock which can swing on bearings. A rope is tied to a wheel or lever on the headstock, and hangs down to the bell ringer. To ring the bell, the ringer pulls on the rope, swinging the bell. The motion causes the clapper to strike the inside of the bell rim as it swings, thereby sounding the bell. Some bells have full-circle wheels, which is used to swing the bell through a larger arc, such as in the United Kingdom where full- circle ringing is practised.

Bells which are not swung are "chimed", which means they are struck by an external hammer, or by a rope attached to the internal clapper, which is the tradition in Russia.

Blessing of bells

In some churches, bells are often blessed before they are hung.

In the Roman Catholic Church the name Baptism of Bells has been given to the ceremonial blessing of church bells, at least in France, since the eleventh century. It is derived from the washing of the bell with holy water by the bishop, before he anoints it with the "oil of the infirm" without and with chrism within; a fuming censer is placed under it and the bishop prays that these sacramentals of the Church may, at the sound of the bell, put the demons to flight, protect from storms, and call the faithful to prayer.

History
Before the introduction of church bells into the Christian Church, different methods were used to call the worshippers: playing trumpets, hitting wooden planks, shouting, or using a courier. In AD 604, Pope Sabinian officially sanctioned the usage of bells. These tintinnabula were made from forged metal and did not have large dimensions. Larger bells were made at the end of the 7th and during the 8th century by casting metal originating from Campania. The bells consequently took the name of campana and nola from the eponymous city in the region. This would explain the apparently erroneous attribution of the origin of church bells to Paulinus of Nola in AD 400. By the early Middle Ages, church bells became common in Europe. They were first common in northern Europe, reflecting Celtic influence, especially that of Irish missionaries. Before the use of church bells, Greek monasteries would ring a flat metal plate (see semantron) to announce services. The signa and campanae used to announce services before Irish influence may have been flat plates like the semantron rather than bells. The oldest surviving circle of bells in Great Britain is housed in St Lawrence Church, Ipswich.

In literature
The evocative sound of church bells has inspired many writers, both in poetry and prose.

Controversies about noise 

The sound of church bells is capable of causing noise that interrupts or prevents people from sleeping. A 2013 study from the Swiss Federal Institute of Technology in Zurich found that "An estimated 2.5-3.5 percent of the population in the Canton of Zurich experiences at least one additional awakening per night due to church bell noise." It concluded that "The number of awakenings could be reduced by more than 99 percent by, for example, suspending church bell ringing between midnight and 06 h in the morning", or by "about 75 percent (...) by reducing the sound-pressure levels of bells by 5 dB."

In the Netherlands, there have been lawsuits about church bell noise pollution experienced by nearby residents. The complaints are usually, but not always, raised by new local residents (or tourists who spend the night in the neighbourhood who are not used to the noise at night or during the day. Local residents who had been used to it for longer usually retort that the newcomers "should have known this before they moved here" and that the ringing bells "belong to the local tradition", which sometimes goes back more than a hundred years.

Image gallery

See also

 Bellfounding
 Bolognese bell ringing art
 Campanology
 Central Council of Church Bell Ringers 
 Change ringing
 Handbells
 Loudspeakers in mosques
 Ring of bells
 Russian Orthodox bell ringing
 Veronese bellringing art

References

External links
 
 Animation of English Full-circle church bell ringing
 Video of English full circle-ringing, 8 bells half muffled and one bell tolling
 Video of English full circle-ringing, 8 bells ringing "open"
 Sound of Bells - An Investigation into their tuning
 Research and Identification of Valuable Bells of the Historic and Culture Heritage of Bulgaria and Development of Audio and Video Archive with Advanced Technologies
 Bell-Ringing Central
 Old archive image of church bells in Chatham, Kent, England, ca.1900
All Saints Bell Tower

Bells (percussion)
Campanology